The UAZ Patriot (UAZ-3163) is a mid-size body-on-frame SUV produced by the UAZ division of SeverstalAvto in Ulyanovsk, Russia. It was introduced in 2005 and replaced the older UAZ Simbir (UAZ-3162). Extensive use of newer parts, large carrying capacity, good off-road capabilities and an affordable price (<15,000 USD) predicted good sales in Russia. 12,011 units were sold in the year 2007.

Timeline

In October 2011, UAZ announced the release of a limited edition SUV in honour of the 70th anniversary of the plant. Cars of the anniversary series have different exterior and interior trim details.

In May 2012, the plant built a restyled model of the UAZ Patriot with a different dashboard, which no longer had a handle for the front passenger. It had a new, safer four-spoke steering wheel from the German manufacturer Takata-Petri, 2DIN media player and a USB-connector for flash drives.

In August 2013, UAZ started the production of a renewed Patriot with a new transfer case Dymos featuring electronic control.

A facelifted UAZ Patriot debuted in 2014: the SUV got new bumpers, headlights, seats, an optional multimedia system with navigation and a rear back-up camera, some chassis improvements, and a new turbocharger for the diesel engine.

The UAZ Patriot 4×4 and pickup were to be imported into the United States as the Bremach 4×4 SUV and Bremach Brio in 2022, but Bremach announced a cessation of operations and refunds of deposits as a consequence of the 2022 Russian invasion of Ukraine.

Versions

Note that the Patriot Sport has been discontinued while the UAZ Cargo and UAZ Profi are now the UAZ Professional, and the UAZ Pickup truck is marketed separately.
Since 2012 it is available as the 31638 with the domestically produced turbodiesel ZMZ-51432 meeting Euro-4.
 UAZ Cargo (UAZ-23602-050) — commercial pickup based on the 3163, with a long  wheelbase and a shortened 2-person cabin. Available since 2008.
 UAZ Pickup (UAZ-23632) — a 4-door 5-seat pickup truck based on the 3163, also with a 3000-mm long wheelbase. Available since August 2008.
It was positioned by the developers as a car "for young and active people." Unlike the standard model, the UAZ Patriot Sport has a more narrow rear door openings and is the successor to the UAZ-3160. Due to the shorter overhangs the car has better maneuverability and a smaller turning radius. The UAZ-3164 features two different 2.7-liter petrol engines: the ZMZ-40904 producing 128 hp (Limited Edition) and the 112-horsepower ZMZ-4091 (in the Classic and Comfort versions). The transmission is a 5-speed manual from Korean Dymos Inc., similar to the one that is installed on the standard UAZ Patriot. The production of the UAZ Patriot Sport launched on July 1, 2010. On December 1, 2010, it was temporarily halted.
 UAZ Profi (UAZ-236021, UAZ-236022, UAZ-236323, UAZ-236324) - commercial pickup based UAZ-3163, but with elongated to  wheelbase, a short two-seater or dual four-door 5-seater cabin, cargo platform with two different width. UAZ Pros is equipped with rear- or all-wheel drive, engine ZMZ-409 051 with the increased to 147 hp relative to the initial capacity of the engine ZMZ-40906. Series production began in August 2017.

Specifications
Wheel configuration: 4x4
Number of seats: 5(9*)
Dimensions: /2000 (with roof frames)
Road clearance: 
Equipped vehicle weight:	
Full weight: 
Cargo capacity: 
Max. speed: 
Fuel consumption at :  /  /  (city /out-of-town/ mixed cycles)
Engine: ZMZ-409.10 Inline-four engine
Fuel: Gasoline A-92
Bore X stroke: 
Displacement: 
Maximum power:  at 4600 rpm.
Maximum torque:  at 3900 rpm.
Transmission: Mechanical, 5-stage
Gearbox: 2-stage(I-1, II-1,94)
Front brakes: ventilated disk-type with two cylinders and floating caliper
Rear brakes: drum-type, with one cylinder, with automatic adjustment of the clearance between the lining and the drum
Tyres: 225/75R16, 245/70R16

In service

 : Armed Forces of Belarus
 
 
  Russian Police (including 28 armored cars).
  Russian Border Troops
  Russian Ground Forces As of the end of 2017, 90 UAZ Patriots in the "Pick-Up" version are in service with the 30th Motorized Brigade of the Infantry of the Russian Army, near Samara.
: Serbian Armed Forces (56)

  National Police of Ukraine
  Ukrainian Border Troops
 Donetsk People's Republic (UAZ-23632-148 Esaul)
 Luhansk People's Republic (UAZ-23632-148 Esaul)

See also
 UAZ Simbir, a similar but smaller SUV.

References

Bibliography
Mark Galeotti & Adam Hook, Combat Vehicles of Russia's Special Forces – Spetsnaz, airborne, Arctic and interior troops, New Vanguard series 282, Osprey Publishing Ltd, Oxford 2020.

External links

 Official UAZ Patriot website
 Russian UAZ Patriot community

Mid-size sport utility vehicles
2000s cars
2010s cars
UAZ
Cars of Russia
Police vehicles